Civilian Clothes is a surviving 1920 American silent comedy film produced by Famous Players-Lasky and distributed by Paramount Pictures. It stars Thomas Meighan and was directed by Hugh Ford. This film is based on the 1919 Broadway play, Civilian Clothes, by Thompson Buchanan. Thurston Hall played Meighan's part in the play. Civilian Clothes is preserved at the Gosfilmofond Russian Archives, Moscow.

Plot
As described in a film magazine, Florence Lanham (Mansfield), married in France while a Salvation Army worker to Captain Sam McGinnis (Meighan), returns to society life in America after receiving word that he was killed in battle. She keeps news of her wedding secret and permits the attentions of Billy Arkwright (Hickman), an early lover. When McGinnis suddenly appears on the scene, clothed in startlingly bold habiliments, the Lanham stubbornness asserts itself. To impart upon her his own gospel of democracy, McGinnis obtains the place of a discharged butler in the Lanham household. With the help of a former Colonel and a lively young widow, he succeeds in his plan to teach her a lesson about her snobbishness, completely conquering and humbling the young wife, who finds that, after all, the clothes make little difference to the depth of real love.

Cast
Thomas Meighan as Captain Sam McGinnis
Martha Mansfield as Florence Lanham
Maude Turner Gordon as Mrs. Lanham
Alfred Hickman as William Arkwright
Frank Losee as Walter Dumont
Marie Shotwell as Mrs. Smythe
Warren Cook as Mr. Lanham
Albert Gran as Dodson
Isabelle Garrison as Mrs. Arkwright
Halbert Brown as Major General Girard
Kathryn Hildreth as Elizabeth Lanham

References

External links

1920 films
American silent feature films
American films based on plays
Films directed by Hugh Ford
Paramount Pictures films
1920 comedy films
Silent American comedy films
American black-and-white films
1920s American films